Finch was an Australian hard and pub rock band, initially forming as Stillwater in 1972. In 1973, they changed to Finch and in 1978 they changed their name to Contraband. The band disbanded in 1979.

History

1972–1975: Beginnings and Drouyn
Stillwater formed in 1972 in Sydney as a hard rock band but changed their name to Finch following year. The line-up of Finch was Peter McFarlane on drums, Owen Orford on lead vocals, Bob Spencer on lead guitar, and Tony Strain on bass guitar.

In 1973, they won a 2SM/Pepsi Pop Poll, earning a contract with Picture Records. In January 1974, the group  released their debut single, "Out of Control"/And She Sings", while Spencer was still in high school.

In 1974, Finch contributed to the soundtrack album for the surfing film, Drouyn, which featured surfing world champion, Peter Drouyn. Finch's tracks, "Sail Away", "Lady of Truth" and "Roses" were used in contrast to "jazzy incidental material". The Canberra Times Michael Foster noted the "sound is no less compelling, and perhaps is more evocative because it is less insistent on the one beat and theme".

1976–1977: Thunderbird 
In 1976 released a self-financed debut album, Thunderbird on Eagle Records. It was produced by John Zulaikha (Buffalo), Brian Todd (their manager) and the band. Tony Catterall of The Canberra Times felt it was "not without its merits" as the group "are always at least exuberant", however "[it] suffers sadly from a lack of originality (Free, Status Quo and Black Sabbath influences abound), naivety in the lyrics and poor production". Australian musicologist, Ian McFarlane, noted the group "had a good deal of English-flavoured blues and hard rock buzzing around in their systems". In December they released a single, "Short Changed Again", which peaked at number 29 on the Sydney chart. As the single gained notice their distribution company foundered.

Late in 1976, Finch moved to Melbourne and supported a national tour by Supernaut.

In March 1977 Spencer left to replace Red Symons on guitar in Skyhooks. Tony Strain left the band at the same time. From April to July the band went through nine different members (including Sam Mallett, Skeeta Pereira, Gary Quince, and Graham Thompson) before Peter McFarlane and Orford were joined by Mark Evans (ex AC/DC) on bass guitar, Graham Kennedy on guitar and vocals, and Chris Jones on guitars. The band signed to CBS / Epic Records and issued the single, "One More Time" in October 1977 and they started recording material for their second album in the following month. Dave Hinds (ex-Marshall Brothers, Rabbit) replaced Chris Jones (who joined Feather) on guitar and vocals in December.

1978–1980: Nothing to Hide and Contraband
The band adopted a more hard rock style, and the next single, "Where Were You?" reached number 14 in Melbourne and number 33 in Sydney in February 1978.  The second studio album, Nothing to Hide was released in March 1978. It was produced by Peter Dawkins (Dragon) and provided a second single, the title track (May). The Canberra Times Luis Feliu opined that they continued to provide "punchy rock and roll and a bit of R and B, the British way ... However, Finch's style has now become overworked to the point of being uninteresting". Finch signed with CBS's United States subsidiary label, Portrait Records.

Due to a Dutch band also called Finch, the Australian group were renamed as Contraband.

In October 1978, Portrait released Contraband's debut single, "That's Your Way" and Barry Cram (ex-Pantha, Avalanche, Russell Morris Band) replaced McFarlane on drums, who joined Swanee. In May 1979, Contraband was released, which was also produced by Dawkins. Some interest was generated in the US but the album was not successful in Australia. It provided two singles "Rainin' Again" (March 1979) and "Gimme Some Lovin'" (July) – which is a cover of The Spencer Davis Group 1966 single. Earlier Finch material was re-released under the Contraband name. However Portrait dropped them later in the year and they broke up.

Members
Listed alphabetically:
Barry Cram – drums (1978–1979)
Mark Evans – bass guitar (1977–1979)
David Hinds – guitar, vocals (1977–1979)
Matt Hughes – organ (1973)
Chris Jones – guitar (1977)
Graham Kennedy – guitar, vocals (1977–1979)
Peter McFarlane – drums (1973–1978)
Sam Mallet – guitar (1978)
Owen Orford – vocals (1972–1979)
Sketa Pereira – guitar (1977–1978)
Gary Quince – guitar (1977)
Bob Spencer – guitar (1973–1977)
Tony Strain – bass guitar (1973–1977)
Graham Thompson – bass guitar (1977)

Discography

Studio albums

Singles

References 

Australian hard rock musical groups
Musical groups disestablished in 1979
Musical groups established in 1973